Liriomyza taraxaci is a species of leaf miner flies in the family Agromyzidae.

References

External links

 

Agromyzidae
Articles created by Qbugbot
Insects described in 1927